Tik Tik Tik is a 2018 Indian Tamil-language science fiction thriller film written and directed by Shakti Soundar Rajan. The film features Jayam Ravi, Aaron Aziz and Nivetha Pethuraj in the lead roles. The film is  inspired from the 1998 Michael Bay film Armageddon.  

The film was released on 22 June 2018. and received generally positive reviews from critics and audience, who praised Jayam Ravi's performance, cinematography, background score, soundtrack and VFX, but criticized its logic-defying sequences and writing.

Plot
The DSD team, which consist of Mahendran as its head, find that an asteroid will hit earth in seven days. The lives of people in and around Chennai are at stake. The only way to destroy the asteroid would be with a heavy missile, but upon learning about the less time they decide to recover the missile through illegal means. The team goes ahead with this secret mission with only the Prime Minister, Home Minister and Defence Minister knows about the mission. The biggest challenge is to take it to space, which will only be possible by expert thieves. An escape artist Vasu and his friends Venkat and Appu are hired. Joining them are DSD members Swathi and Raguram. After training, they board the spacecraft Dhruva 1. Before launch, Vasu hears a mysterious voice on the voice channel in his communication device. The voice tells him that Ravi, Vasu's son, has been kidnapped. In order to release him, Vasu must do whatever the voice tells him. 

Dhruva 1 has a successful launch en Route to the space station, the voice tells Vasu to cut some wires, which would cause a fuel leak. He feigns unconsciousness before proceeding to cut the wires. When Venkat questions him, Vasu reveals about Ravi's kidnapping. This causes Dhruva 1 to spiral out of control and crash land on the moon. The crew steps out to do repairs to the ship, where they find the wires cut. The ship is repaired, but the ship has little fuel. Vasu suggests that refueling from the space station to that way, so that they would have an excuse to enter the station. They agree to the plan and request permission to refuel from the space station to which the crew on board the space station approve. Dhruva 1 then leaves the moon, bound for the space station. However, images of Vasu cutting the wires are discovered by Lt. Gen. T. Rithika and brought to Mahendran's attention. However, Mahendran does not pursue the matter further. 

Meanwhile, Dhruva 1 successfully docks at the space station, but the crew are arrested by the crew members, under Captain Li Wei. It is revealed that the crew of the station, know the true intentions behind Dhruva 1's mission, and intend to hold them off, so that the asteroid will hit the Bay of Bengal, destroying India, whilst profiting their country, by the major rebuilding projects. While in the space station, Venkat and Appu hack the space station, causing a power outrage, while Vasu obtains Captain Li Wei's fingerprint and iris in order to enter the chamber with the missile. Vasu manages to make the missile disappear without the alarm system triggering. Captain Li Wei realizes, and interrogates them, assaulting the crew physically. Vasu tells that the missile is in Dhruva 1, but when some of the crew follow Vasu, he kills them on the ship, and conveys a message through Swathi that the missile is pointed at the capital of the country owning the missile, and that he will launch the missile at the city if the crew of Dhruva 1 is not released. 

Dhruva 1's crew are released and proceed to the ship, while Vasu goes to the chamber holding the missile, where it is revealed that the missile was there the whole time, and steals the missile and exits the ship through space, but hits a piece of the station, puncturing his spacesuit. This causes the oxygen tank to leak. But, he successfully manages to get the missile to Dhruva 1. The ship departs from the space station, and Vasu is revived. Meanwhile, Dhruva 2 arrives to refuel Dhruva 1. It is now known why the wires had to be cut, in order for Dhruva 2 to be mobilised. While the mysterious voice instructs Vasu to hand over the missile to the crew of Dhruva 2, Rithika hears this from Mahendran's communication device, and goes to his office, where Mahendran kills her, revealing that he is the mysterious voice and that he wants to sell the missile on the black market. 

Meanwhile, Dhruva 1 successfully refuels and heads to the asteroid to fire the missile, where the crew realised that the missile is missing. Meanwhile, Ravi is released. Mahendran shows the images of Vasu sabotaging the ship and tells that Vasu was the cause of this. The crew realizes that India will be destroyed. However, they reveal that the missile is still on board the spacecraft and is ready to be fired. It is revealed, that Vasu had notified Swathi and Raghuram about the mysterious voice, and that he gave a decoy of the missile to Dhruva 2. The systems on the ship were hacked to reflect the asteroid passing a safety line when it had not. The missile is fired, and the asteroid is split into half, avoiding the earth. However, Dhruva 1 is hit by debris and is about to explode. The crew evacuate the ship in time and reach earth. Ravi reveals the truth about Mahendran as he had grabbed a gold chain belonging to him. Days later, Mahendran presents medals to the Dhruva 1 crew, where Vasu reveals that the whole crew knows about Mahendran, who proceeds to kill himself backstage while Vasu, Appu and Venkat walk away.

Cast
 Jayam Ravi as M. Vasudevan, a trained magician and escape artist who is sent to space on a mission to obtain a missile to destroy an asteroid
 Aaron Aziz as Captain Lee Wei, a cruel Chinese captain of the space station who refuses to give his missile away
 Nivetha Pethuraj as Lt. M. Swathi, an Army official who is also sent on the mission to space
 Aarav Ravi as Ravi Vasudevan, Vasu's son who gets kidnapped by Mahendran and would not be released until Mahendran obtains the missile
 Ramesh Thilak as S. Venkat, Vasu's friend who is also sent on the mission to space
 Arjunan as K. Appu, Vasu's friend who is also sent on the mission to space
 Vincent Asokan as Brig. D. Raguram, an Army official and captain of the mission to space
 Jayaprakash as Chief K. Mahendran, who suspiciously tells Vasu that he has kidnapped Ravi and will release Ravi if Mahendran obtains the missile
 Rethika Srinivas as Lt. Gen. T. Rithika, a high-ranking official who is managing the mission which ends up getting killed by Mahendran
 Balaji Venugopal as Team head
 Aathma Patrick as Terrorist
 Jeeva Ravi as Police officer

Production

Development 
After working together in Miruthan (2016), Jayam Ravi was again impressed by a storyline narrated by Shakti Soundar Rajan and agreed to work on another film in March 2016. Jhabak Movies agreed to produce the venture. It is the first Indian film in the space genre. The team began pre-production work thereafter, with Jayam Ravi describing it as the biggest film in his career.

Casting and crew 
Actress Nivetha Pethuraj joined the film's cast in September 2016.  She was selected due to her knowledge of martial arts. She is trained in jujutsu and kickboxing. Aaron Aziz, a Malaysian-based actor who mostly performed in Malaysian and Singaporean drama and films, was selected as the lead villain, marking his entry into Tamil cinema. Jayam Ravi's son, Aarav, plays the role of his son in this film too.

D. Imman composed the music for this film, continuing his collaboration with the director.

Filming 
The team began filming in October 2016 at EVP Film City and Majestic Studio in Chennai. The film is also being shot in Munnar, where the shooting has been halted for a while due to the arrival of forest elephants near the shooting spot. The total duration of VFX scenes is 80 minutes in the film.

The teaser was released on August 15, 2017. The film was initially scheduled to be released on January 26, 2018, but was postponed and eventually released on June 22, 2018.

Music
The film's score and songs were composed by D. Imman. The title track was released on December 11, 2017. The song was sung by Yogi B, Yuvan Shankar Raja and Sunitha Sarathy. The full album was released on January 6, 2018. The album has eight songs, four of which are instrumental songs (two theme songs and two karaoke songs). All the songs were written by Madhan Karky. This is Imman's 100th album. "Kurumba" (Father's Love) in the film featured real photographs and videos from Jayam Ravi's personal family collection.

Reception

Behindwoods rated the album 3 of 5 stars and said, "Imman knocks the ball out of the park for a six to reach his century, and the ball is travelling to space!"

Release

Theatrical 
The film was released theatrically on 22 June 2018.

Home media 
The satellite rights of the film were sold to Sun TV.

Reception

Box office
Tamil Nadu theatrical rights of the film were sold for 10.5 crore. Tik Tik Tik grossed  3 crore on its first day and  12 crore in first three days in Tamil Nadu. The film collected  at the worldwide box office in 11 days. It grossed US$45,724 in USA, MYR 2,23,745 in Malaysia, £10,480 in UK, A$34,493 in Australia, and NZ$3,424 in New Zealand in its opening weekend. The film collected US$68,812 in USA, £19,046 in UK, and A$49,176 in Australia by the end of the second weekend. Tik Tik Tik collected £20,888 in UK, and MYR 5,01,436 in Malaysia by the end of the third weekend. The film collected MYR 5,11,504 ( 86.6 lacs) in Malaysia by the end of the fourth weekend.

Critical response
Tik Tik Tik received positive reviews from the critics. On the review aggregator website Rotten Tomatoes reported an approval rating of 67% with an average score of 4.0/10, based on 5 reviews. The website's critical consensus reads, "On the whole, Tik Tik Tik could have been much more considering the newness of its genre, but the attempt is certainly a laudable one." 

Thinkal Menon of The Times of India praised the film for the laudable attempt and gave it 3.5 stars out of 5. Sreedhar Pillai of Firstpost praised it as a reasonably entertaining film with a novel concept and gave it 3 out of 5 stars. Manoj Kumar R of The Indian Express said that the concept is not original and gave it 4 out of 5 stars. Sowmya Rajendran of The News Minute praised the film for its impressive VFX scenes. Vikram Venkateswaran of the Quint called the film a harmless entertainer and gave it 3 stars. Sudhir Srinivasan of Cinema Express admired the efforts of the director in this space genre film and gave it 3 stars.

Priyanka Sundar of Hindustan Times called it a film without logic and gave it 1.5 stars. Gautaman Bhaskaran of News18 stated that the film is an unimpressive story, and gave it 1.5 stars. Kirubhakar Purushothaman of India Today called the film a typical underwhelming commercial film set in space, and gave it 1.5 stars. Director Venkat Prabhu and actor Arvind Swami praised the film for the effort. Vishal Menon of The Hindu termed the film simplistic in nature. J. Hurtado of Screen Anarchy noted that the film had many similarities to Armageddon (1998), one of which included the human mission of saving the Earth from an asteroid.

A success celebration was held for the film in Chennai on 29 June 2018.

See also
List of films featuring space stations

References

External links
 

2018 films
2010s Tamil-language films
2018 science fiction action films
Indian science fiction action films
Indian Army in films
Films about astronauts
Films shot in Chennai
Films scored by D. Imman
Indian Space Research Organisation in fiction